

Goal 
The overall goal of INDICARE (The INformed DIalogue about Consumer Acceptability of DRM Solutions in Europe) was to help to reconcile heterogeneous interests of multiple stakeholders, and to support the emergence of a common European position with regard to consumer and user issues of Digital Rights Management (DRM) solutions.

eContent 
INDICARE responded to the 3rd call, subline 3.3: Management of rights for digital content, of the eContent Programme of the European Commission, DG Information Society. INDICARE, a so-called Accompanying Measure, was initiated March 2004 and was scheduled for two years (Ref.: EDC - 53042 INDICARE / 28609). eContent was replaced by eContentplus as of 9 March 2005.

Focus 
INDICARE addresses problems pointed out in the eContent Work Programme 2003–2004: “There has been little attention to the consumer side of managing rights. Questions remain open as to the level of consumer acceptability of rights management solutions. Interface and functionality of systems, as well as policy issues linked to privacy and access to information should be the investigated. The consumer question also involves the easiness of access, the legitimate use of content and business models and the easiness of access for disabled persons” (p. 19). In addition to consumer issues, INDICARE addresses the user side, in particular concerns of creators and small and medium-sized information providers.

Approach 
The INDICARE project establishes and maintains an informed dialogue about consumer and user issues of DRM. Informed dialogue means that discussions will be stimulated and informed by good quality input such as news information and profound analyses (see below). Part of the input will be derived from interdisciplinary in-depth research of the INDICARE partners as well as from knowledge of experts and stakeholders co-operating with INDICARE.

External links 
 INDICARE website  with all publications
 eContent Work Programme 2003–2004 
 eContentplus

Project Consortium 
 Institute for Technology Assessment and Systems Analysis (ITAS), Karlsruhe, Germany (Project Initiator and Co-ordinator)
 Institute for Information Law (IViR), University of Amsterdam, The Netherlands
 Department of Measurement and Information Systems, Budapest University of Technology and Economics, Hungary
 Berlecon Research GmbH, Berlin, Germany

Digital rights management